Capitol Records is an American record label owned by Universal Music Group through its Capitol Music Group imprint. It was founded as the first West Coast-based record label "of note" in the United States in 1942 by Johnny Mercer, Buddy DeSylva, and Glenn E. Wallichs.

An asterisk (*) denotes an artist who no longer records for the label.

# 
 2NE1* (South Korea) (YG Entertainment/Capitol)
 5 Seconds of Summer* (AUS)(Hi Or Hey/Capitol)

A 
 ABBA (US/Canada)
 Adam Ant* (US)
 Salvatore Adamo* (Canada)
 Ryan Adams
 Cannonball Adderley*
 Adeva*
 Trace Adkins* (Capitol Nashville)
 Alice In Chains
 Alfamega (T2G Entertainment/Capitol)
 Lily Allen* (US)
 Laurindo Almeida
 Marc Almond* (US)
 Alter Bridge (North America)
 Anahí
 Patty Andrews*
 The Andrews Sisters*
 April Wine* (outside Canada)
 Ray Anthony*
 Arcadia* (US/Canada)
 Ashton, Gardner & Dyke
 Asleep at the Wheel (Capitol Nashville)
 Ateez* (KQ Entertainment/Legacy/Capitol) 
 Auf Der Maur
 Avant
 Avenged Sevenfold
 Hoyt Axton

B 
 The Bama Band* (Capitol Nashville)
 The Band*
 Joe Barnhill* (Capitol Nashville)
 Syd Barrett* (Harvest/Capitol) (US/Canada)
 Bastille
 Les Baxter, His Orchestra & Chorus
 The Beach Boys* (Brother/Capitol)
 Beastie Boys (Grand Royal/Capitol)
 The Beatles* (North America since '60s, worldwide since 2012)
 Beau Dommage* (Canada)
 Gilbert Bécaud (US)
 Beck
 Bee Gees
 Belinda*
 Belouis Some*
 Jon Bellion
 Ben's Brother
 Dierks Bentley (Capitol Nashville)
 John Berry* (Capitol Nashville)
 BigBang
 Billy Satellite
 Billy Squier
 Blind Melon*
 Birtles & Goble* (licensed from EMI Australia)
 Cilla Black* (US)
 Jeanne Black
 Blondie* (Chrysalis/Capitol)
 Bloodrock*
 Suzy Bogguss* (Capitol Nashville)
 Bone Symphony*
 The Boogie Boys*
 Bran Van 3000*
 Lisa Brokop* (Capitol Nashville)
 Broods
 Garth Brooks* (Liberty/Capitol Nashville)
 Meredith Brooks*
 T. Graham Brown* (Capitol Nashville)
 Luke Bryan (Capitol Nashville)
 Peabo Bryson*
 The Bugaloos*
 Kandi Burruss (Kandi Koated Entertainment/Capitol)
 Butthole Surfers*

C 
 Calum Scott (UK)
 Anita Carter
 Chris Cagle* (Capitol Nashville)
 Kimberly Caldwell (Vanguard/Capitol)
 Cali Swag District (Checkmate Music/Capitol)
 Glen Campbell* (Capitol Nashville)
 Mandy Capristo
 Rodney Carrington (Capitol Nashville)
 Paulette Carlson* (Capitol Nashville)
 Clyde Carson  (Moe Doe/Black Wall Street/Capitol)
 Deana Carter* (Capitol Nashville)
 George Chakiris
 Nels Cline
 Channel Live*
 Cee Cee Chapman* (Curb/Capitol)
 Cherish (Sho'Nuff/Capitol)
 Che'Nelle
 Chingy*
 June Christy (Capitol)
 Eric Church (Capitol Nashville)
 Jameson Clark (Capitol Nashville)
 Robin Clark* (Capitol Nashville)
 Terri Clark (Capitol Nashville)
 Johnny Clegg
 George Clinton*
 Tom Cochrane* (Capitol Canada)
 Cockney Rebel (Capitol Canada)*
 Cocteau Twins* (US)
 Cold War Kids* (US)
 Coldplay* (US)
 Lloyd Cole* (US)
 Nat "King" Cole*
 Jamie Cullum
 Natalie Cole*
 Jessi Colter* (Capitol Nashville)
 Les Compagnons de la chanson (US)
 Canary Conn (as Danny O'Connor)
 The Cover Girls*
 Billy "Crash" Craddock*
 Jimi Cravity (sixstepsrecords/Capitol CMG)
 Jim Croce*
 Crowded House (US)*
 Crowder (sixstepsrecords/Capitol CMG)

D 
 Neil Diamond
 Kenny Dale* (Capitol Nashville)
 Lacy J. Dalton* (Capitol Nashville)
 The Dandy Warhols*
 Bobby Darin*
 The Dave Clark Five* (Canada)
 David & Jonathan
 Clay Davidson* (Capitol Nashville)
 Miles Davis* (Capitol Jazz)
 Billy Dean* (Capitol Nashville)
 Dear Jayne
 The Decemberists
 Dem Franchize Boyz
 Depeche Mode* (Virgin/Capitol) (US)
 Duncan Laurence
 Kevin Devine
 Dilated Peoples*
 Dink*
 Dinning Sisters
 Dirty Vegas* (North America)
 Thomas Dolby* (US and Canada)
 Amber Dotson* (Capitol Nashville)
 George Ducas* (Capitol Nashville)
 Whitney Duncan* (Capitol Nashville)
 Duran Duran* (US and Canada)

E 
 Edward Bear
 Epik High*
 Empire of the Sun
 Ty England* (Capitol Nashville)
 Faith Evans*
 Everclear*
 Skip Ewing* (Capitol Nashville)
 Enhypen* (Belift Lab/Capitol)
 Exodus

F 
 Fanny Hamlin*
 Ferras
 Sky Ferreira
 FLETCHER
 Shane Filan (Capitol/Universal UK)
 Tim Finn*
 The Fireman* (Hydra/Capitol) (US/Canada)
 Fischerspooner*
 Fish* (Canada)
 Kay Flock
 FN Meka*
 The Folk Crusaders (Toshiba/Capitol)
 Foo Fighters* (Roswell/Capitol)
 Tennessee Ernie Ford* (Capitol Nashville)
 The Fortunes
 Four Freshmen
 Four Preps
 Cleve Francis* (Capitol Nashville)
 Stan Freberg*
 Doug E. Fresh* (Bust It/Capitol)
 The F-Ups

G 
 Judy Garland*
 Larry Gatlin* (Capitol Nashville)
 Crystal Gayle* (Capitol Nashville)
 Gentle Giant* (US and Canada)
 Bobbie Gentry
 Sonny Geraci* 
 Gerry and the Pacemakers (Canada)
 Glass Tiger* (Canada)
 Jackie Gleason*
 The Golden Cups (Toshiba EMI/Capitol)
 The Goldens* (Capitol/SBK)
 Good Charlotte
 Grand Funk Railroad*
 Graffiti6*
 Amy Grant (Sparrow/Capitol CMG)
 Great White*
 Andy Griffith*

H 
 Sammy Hagar
 Hager Twins
 Merle Haggard* (Capitol Nashville)
 Geri Halliwell* (US releases only)
 Halsey
 Caylee Hammack (Capitol Nashville)
 Jennifer Hanson* (Capitol Nashville)
 Joni Harms* (Capitol Nashville)
 Odessa Harris*
 George Harrison* (Dark Horse/Apple/Capitol) (US)
 Walker Hayes* (Capitol Nashville)
 Jamie Haywards
 Heart*
 Niykee Heaton
 Hedley
 Heir Apparent*
 The Heirs (US)
 Helix
 Don Henley
 HRVY
 Milt Herth
 Hey Violet (Hi or Hey/Capitol)
 Jimi Hendrix* (US)
 J. Holiday (Music Line/Capitol)
 The Hollies* (Canada)
 The Honeys
 Steven Wayne Horton* (Capitol Nashville)
 Jedd Hughes* (Capitol Nashville)
 The Human Beinz
 Hurricane* (Grand Royal/Capitol)
 Hurt

I 
 Janis Ian*
 Ice Cube* (Priority/Capitol)
 Ice Spice (10K Projects/Capitol)
 Icon
 If
 Frank Ifield (US/Canada)
 Industry
 Iron Maiden (Harvest/Capitol) (US/Canada)
 Inner Circle
 The Insect Trust

J 
 Alan Jackson (EMI Nashville)
 Freddie Jackson*
 Wanda Jackson*
 Harry James
 Sonny James
 Jaicko
 Matthew Jay*
 The Jenkins* (Capitol Nashville)
 Jimmy Eat World*
 Eddie Jobson*
 The Jodimars*
 Elton John* (US/Canada)
 Lia Marie Johnson
 Plas Johnson
 Josie & The Pussycats*
 Joy of Cooking

K 
 Katrina & the Waves (outside Canada)*
 Kang Daniel (Konnect Entertainment/Capitol)
 Danny Kaye*
 Tori Kelly
 Jesse Kinch*
 Carole King*
 The Kingston Trio*
 The Knack*
 Dave Koz*
 Kraftwerk (US)*
 Kudai
 Klaatu (outside Canada)*
 Kay Flock *

L 
 Lady A* (Capitol Nashville)
 Pierre Lalonde*
 Duncan Laurence
 LCD Soundsystem
 Chris LeDoux* (Capitol Nashville)
 Peggy Lee*
 John Lennon*
 Sean Lennon* (Grand Royal/Capitol)
 Less Than Jake*
 LeToya* (Capitol)
 The Lettermen
 Lewis Capaldi (US)
 Dua Lipa (Dua Lipa Limited, Warner Music Group)
 Little Big Town (Capitol Nashville)
 Little River Band* (Harvest/Capitol)
 Lil Yachty (Quality Control/Solid Foundation/Capital/Motown)
 Loren Gray
 Liu Chia-Chang*
 Show Lo
 Laurie London
 Jennifer Lopez* (2101/Capitol)
 Tito Lopez
 Donna Loren
 Luscious Jackson* (Grand Royal/Capitol)
 Donna Lynn

M 
 Mabel* (Polydor Records)
 J.D. Martin (Capitol Records Nashville)
 Mad River
 Barbara Mandrell* (Capitol Nashville)
 Gordon MacRae*
 Meredith MacRae
 Mae*
 Magic System
 Mantronix*
 Mandy Capristo
 Marcy Playground*
 Marillion* (US and Canada)
 Dean Martin*
 Al Martino*
 Richard Marx*
 Mason Dixon* (Capitol Nashville)
 Conor Maynard* (US)
 Max Webster* (Outside of Canada)
 Maze*
 Kym Mazelle*
 MC Hammer*
 McAuley Schenker Group (MSG) (US)
 Paul McCartney & Wings (primarily US)
 Delbert McClinton*
 Jennette McCurdy (Capitol Nashville)
 Mindy McCready* (Capitol Nashville)
 Mel McDaniel* (Capitol Nashville)
 Kevin McHale* (US/UK/Ireland)
 Sarah McLachlan* (Nettwerk/Capitol) (Canada)
 Scott McQuaig* (Capitol Nashville)
 McQueen Street (SBK/Capitol)
 Megadeth* (Combat/Capitol)
 Mellow Man Ace
 Roy D. Mercer (Capitol Nashville)
 Midnight Red*
 Migos 
 Miilkbone*
 Dean Miller* (Capitol Nashville)
 Jody Miller* (Capitol Nashville)
 Mrs. Miller
 Mrs Mills* (Canada)
 Ned Miller*
 Steve Miller Band* (Worldwide and later US/Canada only)
 Mims* (American King Music/Capitol)
 Liza Minnelli*
 Kylie Minogue* (US/Japan)
 Missing Persons*
 Molly Hatchet*
 Joey Montana
 Melba Moore*
 Patrick Moraz (Cinema/Capitol)*
 Meli'sa Morgan*
 Morningwood
 Morrissey
 The Motels*
 Dude Mowrey* (Capitol Nashville)
 Mae Muller
 Anne Murray* (Capitol Canada/Capitol Nashville)
 My Morning Jacket* (ATO/Capitol)

N 
 NCT 127 (SM Entertainment/Capitol; co-signed to Caroline Distribution)
 Norah Jones (US)-signed to Blue Note)
 Niall Horan (IRE)
 Naughty Boy (US)
 Emilio Navaira* (Capitol Nashville)
 Willie Nelson* (Capitol Nashville)
 Juice Newton* (Capitol Nashville)
 Wayne Newton*
 Britt Nicole (co-signed to Sparrow Records)
 NF
 Nine Inch Nails

O 
 Oaktown's 357* (Bust It/Capitol)
 OK Go
 Troy Olsen (EMI Nashville)
 O'Bryan*
 Jamie O'Neal* (Capitol Nashville)
 ONR.
 Donny Osmond* (US/Canada)
 Marie Osmond* (Curb/Capitol Nashville)
 Otep*
 Johnny Otis Show
 The Outsiders*
 Buck Owens* (Capitol Nashville)

P 
 Allison Paige* (Capitol Nashville)
 Pallas* (US/Canada)
 John Pardi (Capitol Nashville)
 Passion Conferences (sixstepsrecords/Capitol CMG)
 Les Paul & Mary Ford*
 Liam Payne
 Pearl River* (Liberty/Capitol Nashville)
 People!
 Pet Shop Boys* (US/Canada)
 Katy Perry
 Pentagon (Cube Entertainment/Capitol)
 Peter & Gordon* (US/Canada)
 Liz Phair* (Matador/Capitol)
 Édith Piaf* (US and Canada)
 Pink Floyd* (US/Canada)
 The Pipkins
 The Plasmatics
 Lisa Marie Presley*
 Pirates of the Mississippi* (Capitol Nashville)
 Poison*
 The Power Station* (US and Canada)
 Pru
 PTAF
 Purple Popcorn* (American King/Capitol)
 Robyn Peterson

Q 
 Queen* (1984–1989 in the US and Canada)
 Queen Naija
 Queensrÿche (EMI America)
 Quicksilver Messenger Service*

R 
 Eddie Rabbitt* (Capitol Nashville)
 Radiohead* (US)
 Corinne Bailey Rae (US)*
 Bonnie Raitt*
 Sue Raney
 Raspberries
 Eddy Raven* (Capitol Nashville)
 Lou Rawls*
 RBD
 Re-Flex*
 Red Café* (Hoo Bangin'/Capitol)
 Helen Reddy*
 Matt Redman (sixstepsrecords/Capitol CMG)
 Red Rider
 Alaina Reed*
 Del Reeves* (Capitol Nashville)
 Relient K (Gotee/Capitol)
 Remy Ma
 Renaissance* (Sovereign/Capitol) (US/Canada)
 Priscilla Renea
 Nacole Rice* (Twenty Two Recordings/Capitol)
 Nelson Riddle & His Orchestra*
 The Righteous Brothers*
 Rigor Mortis
 Tex Ritter*
 River Road* (Capitol Nashville)
 Don Robertson
 Johnny Rodriguez* (Capitol Nashville)
 Kenny Rogers* (Liberty/Capitol Nashville)
 Maggie Rogers* (Liberty/Capitol Nashville)
 Roy Rogers* (Capitol Nashville)
 Linda Ronstadt* (Festival Mushroom/Capitol)
 Rucka Rucka Ali (Pinegrove/Capitol)
 Darius Rucker (Capitol Nashville)
 Pablo Ruiz (EMI-Capitol)
 Runner Runner
 Andy Russell
 Red Hot Chili Peppers

S 
 Frank Sinatra*
 Kyu Sakamoto
 The Salty Peppers*
 Richie Sambora
 Emeli Sandé (US)
 Tommy Sands
 Saosin
 Savuka
 Sawyer Brown* (Curb/Capitol Nashville)
 Don Schlitz* (Capitol Nashville)
 Thom Schuyler* (Capitol Nashville)
 Jack Scott*
 Dan Seals* (Capitol Nashville)
 Seatrain
 Second Coming
 The Seekers*
 Bob Seger*
 Bob Seger & the Silver Bullet Band*
 Bob Seger System*
 Sequal*
 S'Express*
 Helen Shapiro (US and Canada)
 Shenandoah* (Capitol Nashville)
 Sheriff*
 Shiva's Headband
 Ryan Shupe & The RubberBand* (Capitol Nashville)
 Silentó
 Silverstein
 Troye Sivan
 Skinny Puppy* (Nettwerk/Capital)
 Skyy*
 Slik Toxik
 Slum Village* (Barak/Capitol)
 Hurricane Smith
 Russell Smith* (Capitol Nashville)
 Sam Smith
 Snoop Dogg* (Priority/Capitol)
 Tom Snow
 Jo-El Sonnier* (Capitol Nashville)
 Joe South
 Sparklehorse*
 Spandau Ballet*
 Tracie Spencer*
 Rick Springfield*
 Billy Squier*
 Jo Stafford*
 Kristian Stanfill (sixstepsrecords/Capitol CMG)
 Kay Starr
 Ringo Starr* (US)
 Status Quo* (US)
 Steriogram
 Ray Stevens*
 Rod Stewart
 Skye Sweetnam* (Capitol/EMI Canada)
 Stone Poneys
 Strange Advance* (US and Canada)
 Stryper
 Yma Sumac*
 Sun*
 Stefanie Sun*
 The Superiors
 SuperM (SM Entertainment/Capitol; co-signed to Caroline Distribution)
 The Sweet* (US)
 The Sylvers*
 Lea Salonga

T 

 A Taste of Honey*
 Tavares*
 Télépopmusik* (Catalogue/Capitol)
 Teresa Teng
 These Kids Wear Crowns (Universal)
 Thirty Seconds To Mars (Universal Music)
 Lillo Thomas*
 Lynda Thomas
 Cyndi Thomson* (Capitol Nashville)
 Hank Thompson* (Capitol Nashville)
 Ed Townsend
 Trader-Price* (Capitol Nashville)
 Merle Travis* (Capitol Nashville)
 Charles Trenet (US and Canada)
 Triumvirat
 Jolin Tsai*
 The Rose (J-STAR Entertainment/Transparent Arts/Capitol)
 The Tubes*
 Tanya Tucker* (Capitol Nashville)
 Kreesha Turner
 Tina Turner*

U 
 Carrie Underwood (Capitol Nashville)
 Keith Urban (Capitol Nashville)

V 
 Gene Vincent & His Blue Caps
 The Vines
 Vow Wow
 Valley

W 
 Steve Wariner* (Capitol Nashville)
 W.A.S.P
 Gene Watson* (Capitol Nashville)
 Waysted
 Max Webster* (outside Canada)
 Bob Welch*
 Emily West (Capitol Nashville)
 Westside Connection*
 Cheryl Wheeler* (Capitol Nashville)
 The Whispers*
 Ron White (Capitol Nashville)
 Lari White* (Capitol Nashville)
 Jack Wild
 The Wild Ones (Toshiba/Capitol)
 Wild Rose* (Capitol Nashville)
 Robbie Williams* (US)
 Ann Wilson
 Brian Wilson*
 Nancy Wilson*
 Tim Wilson (Capitol Nashville)
 Curtis Wright* (Liberty/Capitol Nashville)

X 
 XYZ*
 XXXTentacion*

Y 
 "Weird Al" Yankovic*
 Billy Yates* (Capitol Nashville)
 Yellowcard*
 Faron Young* (Capitol Nashville)
 Don Yute

References 

Capitol
Capitol Records
Capitol Records artists